Sherman Township is a civil township of Huron County in the U.S. state of Michigan. The population was 1,083 at the 2010 census.

Communities 
The ZIP code is 48470. The first white settler was John Hunsanger, a native of Hadhomor, Nassau, Germany, who arrived there in 1855. The following year, several families from Baden joined him, and in the early 1860s, another group arrived from Westphalia. The area became known as the "German Settlement". It was also called "Adams Corners" for landowner August H. Adams, who served as the first postmaster. But when the village got a post office in October 1880, it was named "Ruth", after Michael Ruth who had given property for a railroad depot.
The community is named for a large white limestone boulder offshore in Lake Huron, to define the territory ceded with the Treaty of Detroit in 1807.

Geography
According to the United States Census Bureau, the township has a total area of 44.2 square miles (114.3 km), of which 44.1 square miles (114.3 km) is land and 0.02% is water.

Demographics
As of the census of 2000, there were 1,165 people, 444 households, and 343 families residing in the township. There were 620 housing units at an average density of 14.0 per square mile (5.4/km). The racial makeup of the township was 98.54% White, 0.69% Asian, 0.34% from other races, and 0.43% from two or more races. Hispanic or Latino of any race were 1.03% of the population.

There were 444 households, out of which 33.3% had children under the age of 18 living with them, 69.4% were married couples living together, 4.1% had a female householder with no husband present, and 22.7% were non-families. 20.9% of all households were made up of individuals, and 10.8% had someone living alone who was 65 years of age or older.  The average household size was 2.62 and the average family size was 3.06.

In the township the population was spread out, with 28.0% under the age of 18, 6.0% from 18 to 24, 24.3% from 25 to 44, 25.6% from 45 to 64, and 16.1% who were 65 years of age or older.  The median age was 39 years. For every 100 females, there were 106.2 males.  For every 100 females age 18 and over, there were 102.7 males.

The median income for a household in the township was $32,875, and the median income for a family was $38,417. Males had a median income of $29,107 versus $17,109 for females. The per capita income for the township was $15,013.  About 5.6% of families and 6.3% of the population were below the poverty line, including 5.5% of those under age 18 and 8.8% of those age 65 or over.

References

Townships in Huron County, Michigan
Townships in Michigan
Populated places on Lake Huron in the United States